HIP 11915 is a G-type main-sequence star located about 190 light-years from Earth in the constellation Cetus. It is best known for its characteristics, which are very similar to those of the Sun, including the mass, radius, temperature, metallicity and age, which means that it is almost a solar twin, being just 500 million years younger than the Sun and with a lower metallicity. It is also known for its planetary companion, HIP 11915 b, which has a mass and orbital distance very similar to that of Jupiter, but probably with a slightly higher orbital eccentricity.

This star is entry number 11915 in the Hipparcos Catalogue. The star is located at 02:33:49.02495 right ascension, −19° 36' 42.5032" dec. Too faint to be seen with the unaided eye, the star can be spotted with good binoculars.

Stellar characteristics
HIP 11915 is a G-type main sequence star that is just about the same mass of and likely 101% the radius of the Sun. It has a temperature of 5760 K and is 4.16 billion years old, nearly 500 million years younger than the Sun, which is about 4.6 billion years old and has a temperature of 5778 K.

The star is slightly poor in metals, with a metallicity ([Fe/H]) of about −0.059, or about 87% of the amount of iron and other heavier metals found in the Sun. Given the similar properties of the Sun, HIP 11915's luminosity is likely close to the same as the Sun (give or take about 10% in uncertainty).

Planetary system

The system contains a gas giant, HIP 11915 b, with a mass and orbit very similar to that of Jupiter, located at approximately the same distance from its star. The discovery of HIP 11915 b is significant, because it is the first, and to date only, distant planetary system found that may be somewhat like the Solar System. The radial velocity data also indicates that there is no large gas giant in this system with an orbital period of less than 1000 days. This means that there could be one or more terrestrial planets in the inner parts of the system, and the possibility of a habitable Earth-like planet.

This new discovery was made at the La Silla Observatory in Chile, using the High Accuracy Radial Velocity Planet Searcher instrument mounted on the European Southern Observatory's 3.6-meter telescope.

According to Jorge Meléndez, who led the University of São Paulo, Brazil team that discovered HIP 11915 b, "the quest for an Earth 2.0, and for a complete Solar System 2.0, is one of the most exciting endeavors in astronomy".

Comparison to the Sun
This chart compares the properties of the Sun to HIP 11915.

Footnotes

References

Cetus (constellation)
Planetary systems with one confirmed planet
Solar twins
G-type main-sequence stars
016008
011915
BD-20 0481